Polar Airlines (Poljarnýe avialinii) is an airline based in Yakutsk, Sakha Republic, Russia. It operates scheduled and charter passenger and cargo services. In 2022, it became part of Russia's single far-eastern airline, along with four other airlines.

History 

The airline began operations in 1997. It was formed from the Batagai, Kolyma-Indigirka, Chukordakh and Tiksi sub-divisions of Aeroflot.

Destinations
Polar Airlines operates scheduled flights to the following destinations (as of January 2013):

 Russia
Aldan - Aldan Airport 
Bratsk - Bratsk Airport
Chersky - Chersky Airport
Chokurdakh - Chokurdakh Airport
Irkutsk - International Airport Irkutsk
Lensk - Lensk Airport
Neryungri - Chulman Airport
Tiksi - Tiksi Airport
Yakutsk - Yakutsk Airport
Zyryanka - Zyryanka Airport

Accidents & Incidents
May 16, 2003 Antonov An-3T RA-05881 force-landed 28 mi from Sangara due to engine failure caused by bad weather; all 13 on board survived, but the aircraft was written off.
November 18, 2005 Antonov An-2TP RA-02252 crashed on a mountain 19 mi from Sangar in bad weather; all 12 on board survived, but the aircraft was written off.
November 21, 2012 Flight 227 (performed by Antonov An-26 RA-26061) from Yakutsk to Deputatsky overshot the runway on landing by 70 metres. The airline reported an icy runway as the cause. The plane received substantial damage but no injuries were reported.
July 2, 2013 Flight 9949, a Mil Mi-8 (registration RA-22657) crashed into a hill top 66 km from Deputatsky in the Sakha Republic. 19 of the 25 passengers and 3 crew were killed; of these deaths, several children were involved. 11 of the 25 passengers were children. A post crash fire consumed the aircraft. This was the first fatal accident for the airline.
August 16, 2013 Flight 9977, an Antonov An-2TP (registration RA-01419), made a forced landing near Vilyuisk following an unexplained engine problem; all 11 on board survived, but the aircraft was destroyed by a post-crash fire.
October 11, 2016 Flight 203, an Antonov An-26 RA-26660 landed short of the runway at Belaya Gora Airport. The aircraft was severely damaged. All 33 people on board survived.

Fleet 

As of July 2012 the Polar Airlines fleet includes:

References

External links 

 

Airlines of Russia
Airlines established in 1997
Former Aeroflot divisions
Helicopter airlines
Companies based in Sakha Republic
Russian companies established in 1997